Dorothy Greville Cumming (12 April 1894 – 10 December 1983) was an actress of the silent film era. She appeared in 39 American, English, and Australian films between 1915 and 1929, notably appearing as the Virgin Mary in Cecil B. DeMille's 1927 film The King of Kings and the jealous wife in Lillian Gish's 1928 The Wind. She also appeared in stage productions in those same countries.

Childhood and early career
Dorothy Greville Cumming was born in Boorowa, New South Wales. Her father, Victor Albert Cumming, born in 1859 in Brisbane, Queensland, was an officer of the Lands Department and also owned Narrangullen sheep station, near Yass. Her mother was the former Sarah T. Fennell. Her paternal grandparents, Frederick Cumming and Agnes Jane Stuart, were born in Scotland and England, respectively.

The family moved to Sydney around 1904, settling in the Sydney suburb of Woollahra. There, while a student at Ascham School, Dorothy attended elocution and acting lessons, appearing on stage from 1907. In 1911 she appeared with Enid Bennett in J. C. Williamson's production Everywoman.

In 1915 she appeared in the 6 reel J.C. Williamson film Within our Gates, or Deeds that Won Gallipoli, a spy drama directed by English actor-director Frank Harvey. At this time Williamsons made a handful of films using their own actors, in response to the threat of increasing American imports, including Get-Rich-Quick Wallingford and Officer 666, directed by Fred Niblo. Determined to follow a career in film, Cumming departed for the US in mid 1916.

Cumming had three full siblings, including two sisters who also moved to the United States. Rose Cumming became a prominent American interior decorator, and Eileen Cumming an advertising executive, who married rheumatologist Russell LaFayette Cecil. Cumming also had several half-siblings from her mother's first marriage.

Marriages
Cumming was married twice. Her husbands were:

Frank Elliott Dakin (married 4 April 1922, separated 1925, divorced 9 December 1927), a stage director known professionally as Frank Elliott. They had two sons, each of whom took his mother's maiden name after their parents' divorce: Anthony "Tony" Cumming and Lt. Greville C. E. Cumming.
Allan McNab, married 2 August 1932. He was a British artist and designer who became the art director of Life, worked as design director for Norman Bel Geddes, and became the director of administration of the Art Institute of Chicago.

Death
She died in New York City in 1983.

Selected filmography

 Snow White (1916)
 A Woman Who Understood (1920)
 The Notorious Miss Lisle (1920)
 The Woman and the Puppet (1920)
 The Notorious Mrs. Sands (1920)
 Ladies Must Live (1921)
 Don't Tell Everything (1921)
 The Man From Home (1922)
 Manslaughter (1922)
 The Cheat (1923)
 The Self-Made Wife (1923)
Twenty-One (1923)
 Nellie, the Beautiful Cloak Model (1924)
 The Female (1924)
 The Manicure Girl (1925)
 A Kiss for Cinderella (1925)
 One Way Street (1925)
 The New Commandment (1925)
 Dancing Mothers (1926)
 For Wives Only (1926)
 Mademoiselle Modiste (1926)
 Butterflies in the Rain (1926)
 The King of Kings (1927)
 In Old Kentucky (1927)
 The Lovelorn (1927)
 Forbidden Hours (1928)
 Life's Mockery (1928)
 Our Dancing Daughters (1928)
 The Wind (1928)
 Kitty (1929)

References

External links

Rose Cumming, Russell L. Cecil, and Affiliated Families Photographs and Papers at the New-York Historical Society.

1894 births
1983 deaths
Australian silent film actresses
Australian stage actresses
People from New South Wales
Actresses from New York City
20th-century Australian actresses
19th-century Australian women
People educated at Ascham School